Gnaeus Pompeius may refer to:

Relatives of Pompey the Great
 Gnaeus Pompeius Strabo
 Pompey (Gnaeus Pompeius Magnus)
 Gnaeus Pompeius Magnus (son of Pompey)
 Gnaeus Pompeius Magnus (husband of Claudia Antonia)

Others
 Gnaeus Pompeius Trogus (1st century BC), a Roman historian who adopted the nomen Pompeius from Pompey the Great after serving in Pompey's war against Quintus Sertorius
 Gnaeus Pompeius (consul 31 BC) (died 14 AD), possibly the great-grandson of the Roman dictator Lucius Cornelius Sulla, suffect consul in 31 BC

See also
 Pompeia gens